Colonel James Hesketh Biggs was a 19th-century painter, photographer and engraver in South Australia who was active in the 1860s and 1870s. He was renowned in his day and won numerous awards, but most of his work is now lost.

See also
Visual arts of Australia

References

Australian painters
Australian engravers
Australian photographers
Year of birth missing (living people)
Living people